The Adventures of Red Ryder is a 1940 12-chapter Republic movie serial directed by William Witney and John English and starring Don "Red" Barry and Noah Beery, Sr., based on the Western comic strip Red Ryder. This serial is the 18th of the 66 serials produced by Republic.

Premise
The plot follows a standard B-Western pattern of a villain trying to run the legitimate owners off their valuable land. In this case, the value comes from the building of a railroad.

Synopsis
A gang, led by banker Calvin Drake, plans to drive off ranchers from their land to profit from a railroad. However, on one of these ranches, the Circle R, lives the Ryder family who resist the gang. After his father, Tom, is killed by One Eye Chapin, Red Ryder swears revenge and sets out to defeat the gang once and for all.

Cast
Don "Red" Barry as Red Ryder. Donald Barry retained the nickname from this serial as Don "Red" Barry.
Noah Beery as Ace Hanlon
Tommy Cook as Little Beaver
Maude Pierce Allen as Duchess Ryder
Vivian Coe as Beth Andrews
Harry J. Worth as Calvin Drake
Hal Taliaferro as Cherokee Sims
William Farnum as Colonel Tom Ryder
Bob Kortman as One-Eye Chapin
Carleton Young as Sheriff Dade

Production
The Adventures of Red Ryder was based on Fred Harman's comic strip. The serial was budgeted at $144,852 although the final negative cost was $145,961 (a $1,109, or 0.8%, overspend). 1940 was the first year in which Republic's overall spending on serial production was less than in the previous year. It was filmed between 27 March and 25 April 1940. The serial's production number was 997. The special effects were created by the Lydecker brothers, Republic's in-house effects team.

Stunts
David Sharpe as Red Ryder (doubling Don "Red" Barry)
Duke Green
Ted Mapes
Post Park
Ken Terrell
Bill Yrigoyen
Joe Yrigoyen

Release

Theatrical
The Adventures of Red Ryder'''s official release date is 28 June 1940, although this is actually the date the sixth chapter was made available to film exchanges.

Chapter titles
 Murder on the Santa Fe Trail (27min 48s)
 Horsemen of Death (16min 42s)
 Trail's End (16min 41s)
 Water Rustlers (16min 39s)
 Avalanche (16min 44s)
 Hangman's Noose (16min 44s)
 Framed (16min 42s)
 Blazing Walls (16min 42s)
 Records of Doom (16min 42s)
 One Second to Live (16min 43s)
 The Devil's Marksman (16min 41s)
 Frontier Justice (16min 44s)

Source:

This was one of two 12-chapter serials produced by Republic in 1940. The other is the following King of the Royal Mounted'', also based on a comic strip. Republic's standard pattern was two 12-chapter serials and two 15-chapter serials in each year.

References

External links
 
 

1940 films
1940 Western (genre) films
American black-and-white films
1940s English-language films
Films based on comic strips
Films based on American comics
Films directed by John English
Films directed by William Witney
Republic Pictures film serials
American Western (genre) films
Films scored by Paul Sawtell
1940s American films
Red Ryder films